JTRE London is a real estate developer based in London, United Kingdom. It was founded by the European real estate developer JTRE with a total value of property developed at approximately €1.6 billion, featuring offices in Bratislava, Prague and London. The company was created in 2019 and completed the acquisition of British luxury residential property developer Sons & Co London Limited in 2020.

History 
In 2018, European real estate developer JTRE entered the UK market by purchasing land in Central London at 185 Park Street in the Bankside district of London. The company agreed to a construction loan of £177m with ICG Real Estate in 2020 and in the same year, construction of The Triptych Bankside development started. It is a residential, office, and retail development consisting of three towers designed by architects Squire and Partners. Sons & Co London Limited (formerly known as L&H) a British real estate developer that delivered over 550 apartments and houses in Central London in over 30 years was appointed as the project's manager. JTRE London was founded in 2019 and in 2020 JTRE acquired Sons & Co. JTRE London partnered with the Southwark-based United St Saviour’s Charity to develop 57 self-contained apartments that will provide affordable homes for the borough’s residents over the age of 60.

Properties 

Notable JTRE London properties include:

London

 Triptych Bankside, South Bank, London - residential, office, and retail development in London's South Bank district due to be completed in 2022.
 Appleby Blue Almshouse, Bermondsey, London - charity almshouse providing independent sheltered housing for the elderly due to be completed in 2021.

Corporate governance 
Juraj Marko is the Managing Director of JTRE London, Alexander Stocker is the Development Director, Christian Stocker is the Acquisitions Director and Simon Roberts is the Commercial Director. JTRE board of directors consists of: Peter Korbačka (chairman), Michal Borguľa, Miroslav Fülöp, Pavel Pelikán, Peter Remenár and Juraj Kalman.

See also 
 Real estate in the United Kingdom
 JTRE

References

External links 

Property companies of the United Kingdom
British companies established in 2019
Companies based in London